A ballast regulator (also known as a ballast spreader or ballast sweeper) is a piece of rail transport maintenance of way equipment used to shape and distribute the gravel track ballast that supports the ties in rail tracks. They are often used in conjunction with ballast tampers when maintaining track.

Ballast regulators are versatile machines, and may also be used by railroads for duties such as plowing snow, removing vegetation from the right-of-way, and digging ditches.

Purpose

Track ballast gradually shifts over time, both from natural forces and as a result of the passage of trains. If this is not addressed, the quality of the track will decrease, resulting in a less smooth ride for trains. Unregulated ballast may also result in the rails shifting out of alignment, which in the worst cases can lead to derailments. Conversely, regular maintenance of ballast can prolong the life of railroad tracks. For these reasons, railroads use ballast regulators to maintain the shape and distribution of track ballast.

Ballast regulators are also used during major track reconstruction. When tracks are rebuilt, new ballast will be dumped along the tracks from hopper cars, and then shaped by a ballast regulator.

Method of operation

A typical ballast regulator has three types of equipment: plow blades, ballast boxes, and rotating brushes.

Plow blades
The plow blades are used to move and shape ballast, often after it has been dropped on the tracks by a ballast train. Most ballast regulators have two plow blades, each double sided and at an angle away from the regulator itself. These blades sculpt the ballast to the proper height, spreading it evenly along the tracks and ties and ensuring it is not too high. The blades are movable and in most cases can be controlled independently, in the event that a blade needs to be used on only one side of the tracks.

Ballast boxes
The ballast boxes serve two purposes — they move ballast that is far away from the tracks closer towards the centerline of the tracks, and contour the ballast to slope downwards away from the tracks perpendicularly. Like the plow blades, the ballast boxes can be adjusted and moved independently of each other as needed.

Rotating brushes
After the plow blades and ballast boxes have leveled and shaped the ballast, frequently some ballast will be left on top of the ties. This is undesirable, because covered ties are impossible to inspect visually for damage and spikes or other fastening materials will be covered as well. To resolve this issue, ballast regulators include rotating drum-shaped brushes which are lowered onto the ties in order to sweep away ballast, thereby leaving the tops of the ties clear and visible.
  
Many railroads use old air-brake hoses filled with wire cables for the brushes, which frequently need replacement. The brushes will typically be covered by rubber flaps similar to mudflaps in order to protect workers from flying stones kicked up by the cleaning process.

Other uses
While ballast regulators are designed primarily to shape and distribute ballast, railroads sometimes use them for several other purposes, including digging ditches, plowing and moving snow, clearing brush from the tracks, and laying cables. Some are intentionally designed to have these additional capabilities.

Manufacturers

 Harsco
 Knox Kershaw
 Nordco
 Plasser & Theurer
 Tamper — bought by Harsco in 1992

Gallery

References

Maintenance of way equipment